HIDEA syndrome is a syndrome characterised by hypotonia, hypoventilation, intellectual disability, dysautonomia, epilepsy, and eye abnormalities. It is caused by the mutation of the P4HTM gene on chromosome 3.

Presentation

This syndrome causes intellectual disability and affects the eyes, musculoskeletal system, and face.

Eyes

Strabismus 

Difficulty fixing the eyes on an object

Face

Facial features gradually become coarser during childhood.

Musculoskeletal system

 Hypotonia
 Planovalgus
 Contractures in elbow joints
 Interphalangeal joint hypermobility 

Other associated features include hypoventilation, obstructive and central sleep apnea and dysautonomia.

Genetics

This condition is caused by mutations in the Prolyl 4-hydroxylase, transmembrane (P4HTM) gene. This gene is located on the short arm of chromosome 3 (3p21.3).

The inheritance of this condition is autosomal recessive.

Diagnosis

The diagnosis may be suspected on clinical grounds. 

It is made by sequencing the P4HTM gene.

Management

There is presently no curative treatment. Management is supportive.

Epidemiology

The prevalence is not known but this is considered to be a rare disease. Only 12 patients have been reported to date.

History

This condition was first described in 2014. The causative mutation was discovered in 2019.

References

Genetic diseases and disorders
Rare syndromes